Crabapple Branch is a stream in Harrison County, Missouri. It is a tributary of Big Creek.

Crabapple Branch (also historically known as "Crab Apple Creek") was named for the crabapple trees in the area.

See also
List of rivers of Missouri

References

Rivers of Harrison County, Missouri
Rivers of Missouri